Nemuro may refer to:

 Nemuro Subprefecture, Hokkaido Prefecture, Japan
 Nemuro, Hokkaido, a city
 Nemuro Peninsula
 Nemuro Strait
 Nemuro Bay
 Nemuro Province, an old province of Japan